Administrative divisions of Ukraine in 1925–1932 consisted of "subdistricts" and was a short lasting intermediary form of administrative division between the old governorate (also gubernia or province) system and the new oblast (also region or province) system. It was mentioned in the 1926 Soviet Census. Counterintuitively, a subdistrict (pidraion) was bigger than a district (raion).

Subdistricts

 Woodland Subdistrict
 Chernihiv Okruha
 Hlukhiv Okruha
 Konotop Okruha
 Korosten Okruha
 Volyn Okruha
 Right-bank Subdistrict 
 Bila Tserkva Okruha
 Berdychiv Okruha
 Kamianets Okruha
 Kyiv Okruha
 Mohyliv Okruha
 Proskuriv Okruha
 Tulchyn Okruha
 Uman Okruha
 Shevchenko Okruha
 Shepetivka Okruha
 Vinnytsia Okruha
 Left-bank Subdistrict
 Izyum Okruha
 Kharkiv Okruha
 Kremenchuk Okruha
 Kupiansk Okruha
 Lubny Okruha
 Nizhyn Okruha
 Poltava Okruha
 Pryluky Okruha
 Romny Okruha
 Sumy Okruha
 Steppe Subdistrict
 Zinovievsk Okruha
 Mariupol Okruha
 Melitopol Okruha
 Mykolaiv Okruha
 Odesa Okruha
 Pervomaisk Okruha
 Starobilsk Okruha (oscillated)
 Kherson Okruha
 Moldavian ASSR
 Dniepropetrovsk Subdistrict
 Dnipropetrovsk Okruha
 Zaporizhia Okruha
 Kryvyi Rih Okruha
 Mining Industrial Subdistrict
 Artemivsk Okruha
 Luhansk Okruha
 Stalino Okruha

References

External links
 L'Oukraine. National Censuses and Vital Statistics in Europe, 1918-1939 (books.google.com).

See also
Okruhas of the Ukrainian SSR

Ukrainian SSR